David Benjamin Moosman (born September 2, 1986) is an American football player who was signed by the Arizona Cardinals as a free agent following the 2010 NFL Draft.  He had previously played four years for the Michigan Wolverines football team, where he was a regular starter on the offensive line as a redshirt junior and senior for the 2008 and 2009 teams.

High school
In high school, Moosman led Libertyville High School in Libertyville, Illinois to an undefeated 2004 season and the Illinois High School Association state championship. He was named All-State as a senior by Chicago Tribune, Chicago Sun-Times and Champaign News-Gazette.  Rivals.com ranked him as the eleventh ranked offensive guard in the nation and the number six prospect in Illinois. Scout.com ranked him as the number 17 offensive lineman in the nation.  He was a three-year varsity wrestler and three-year varsity shot-putter on track. In wrestling, he qualified for the state championships three times.

College

At Michigan, he played in 29 games, starting in 15 games at right guard and 8 games at center.  As a junior, he started all 12 games at right guard and played every snap at right guard.  As a senior, he started 3 games at right guard and 8 at center.

Pro football
Moosman signed as an undrafted free agent with the Arizona Cardinals on April 24, 2010, after going undrafted in the 2010 NFL Draft. An Arizona Cardinals fansite believed that he needed to bulk up to have a chance at success in the NFL. He was cut on August 30.

Personal
His father, Michael, played football at Cornell from 1970–72.  This included the 1971 team that was Ivy League co-champion on the strength of Heisman Trophy runner-up Ed Marinaro.

Notes

External links
Michigan bio
Moosman at NCAA.org
Moosman at AZCardinals.com

1986 births
American football offensive guards
Arizona Cardinals players
Living people
Michigan Wolverines football players
Players of American football from Illinois